George Threlfall may refer to:
 George Threlfall (footballer)
 George Threlfall (engineer)